

The Aeromarine 40F was an American two-seat flying-boat training aircraft produced for the US Navy and built by the Aeromarine Plane and Motor Company of Keyport, New Jersey. Fifty out of an original order for 200 were delivered before the end of World War I, with the remainder cancelled due to the armistice.

The aircraft was a biplane with a pusher propeller. The pilot and instructor sat side by side. The Aeromarine 41 developed from the Aeromarine 40. At least some of the Model 40s were later converted to Model 41s.

Operators

Brazilian Naval Aviation

United States Navy

Variants
Model 40, 40B - Civilian 140 hp Hispano Suiza
Model 40C - 150 hp Aeromarine
Model 40L - 140 hp Aeromarine L
Model 40T - 100 hp Curtiss OXX-6
Model 40U - 100 hp Aeromarine U-6

Specifications (40F)

General characteristics
 Crew: two, pilot and instructor
 Length:  28 ft 11 in (8.8 m)
 Wingspan: 48 ft 6 in (14.8 m)
 Height:  m ( ft  in)
 Wing area: ft2 ( m2)
 Empty weight: 2,061 lb (935 kg)
 Maximum weight: 2,592 lb (1,175 kg)
 Powerplant: 1 × Curtiss OXX V-8, 100 hp (72 kW)

Performance
 Maximum speed: 71 mph (114 km/h)
 Range:   250 miles (403 km)
 Service ceiling: 3,500 ft (1,067 m)
 Rate of climb: ft/min ( m/min)

References

 Taylor, J. H. (ed) (1989) Jane's Encyclopedia of Aviation. Studio Editions: London. p. 29
 Department of the Navy. Naval Historical Center (website).

External links

, from Naval Historical Center

Biplanes
Single-engined pusher aircraft
1910s United States military trainer aircraft
Flying boats
040
Aircraft first flown in 1919